Gordon Grice (born 1965, Guymon, Oklahoma) is an American science writer and horror writer.

Life
Grice grew up in rural Oklahoma, a setting that has figured in much of his writing. He graduated from Oklahoma State University with a BA in English and the University of Arkansas with a Master of Fine Arts in Creative Writing. He is married and has three children. He has taught creative writing for California Institute of the Arts and the UCLA Extension Writers' Program.

His book The Red Hourglass: Lives of the Predators (1998) was listed among the Los Angeles Times Best Nonfiction Books of the Year and the New York Public Library's 25 Books to Remember for 1998. Deadly Kingdom: The Book of Dangerous Animals was published in 2010. Wall Street journal listed it among the "Five Best: Nature Books." Revised editions, retitled The Book of Deadly Animals appeared in 2011 (UK) and 2012 (US). Critic Mark Dery described his work thus: "Fascinated by the alien ways of the nonhuman world, Grice combines the sardonic deadpan of noir fiction with the best naturalists' unsentimental scrutiny of animal behavior and a rural midwesterner's applied knowledge of the predator-prey relationship. A Jean-Henri Fabre for literati who drive pickups with rifle racks."

Grice’s other works include Shark Attacks: Inside the Mind of the Ocean’s Most Terrifying Predator (eBook; National Geographic, 2012) and the children’s book Cabinet of Curiosities: Collecting and Understanding the Wonders of the Natural World (Workman Publishing, 2015). He has also published poetry, fiction, essays, and articles. His nonfiction has appeared in Harper's,  The New Yorker, Discover, Popular Science, and others. His horror stories have appeared in ChiZine, Aurealis, and other magazines and anthologies.

Awards
 1999 Whiting Award
"The White Cat" (short story) chosen for Best of the 'Net 2006
Finalist for the PEN Center West Book Awards in research nonfiction for 1999

Works

Anthologies
 

Kelly A Harmon and Vonnie Winslow Crist, eds. (2019) Not Far from Roswell. Pole to Pole Publishing. 
Lisa Vasquez, ed. (2017) Unleashed: Monsters vs. Zombies Vol. II. Stitched Smile Publications. .
Anna Reith, ed. (2017)  Restless: An Anthology. Frith Books. .

References

External links
Official Website
Profile at The Whiting Foundation
"An Interview with Gordon Grice", Bold Type, Random House   	
"Gordon Grice", West Coast Writers

American male essayists
Oklahoma State University alumni
University of Arkansas alumni
Living people
People from Guymon, Oklahoma
1965 births
American nature writers
American male non-fiction writers
20th-century American essayists
21st-century American essayists
Writers from Oklahoma
20th-century American male writers
21st-century American male writers